The Grand Village of the Kickapoo is a Kickapoo village site in rural McLean County, Illinois, United States. The village site includes the Warren Bane Site, a defensive fort which was built circa 1750 to protect the village. The village was occupied until 1813, when a U.S Army officer under the command of Zachary Taylor burned the village.

The Warren Bane Site has been listed on the National Register of Historic Places since 1982. It is one of the sites that has its address restricted by the National Register due to fear of vandalism and looting.

See also
List of archaeological sites on the National Register of Historic Places in Illinois

References

External links
 Grand Village of the Kickapoo Park

Archaeological sites on the National Register of Historic Places in Illinois
Kickapoo
National Register of Historic Places in McLean County, Illinois
Protected areas of McLean County, Illinois